Eudonia hexamera is a moth in the family Crambidae. It was described by Wei-Chun Li, Hou-Hun Li and Matthias Nuss in 2012. It is found in Sichuan, China.

The length of the forewings is 6–8 mm. The forewings are covered with blackish-brown scales. The antemedian, postmedian and subterminal lines are white. The hindwings are white.

Etymology
The species name refers to the six loops of the ductus bursae in the female genitalia and is derived from Latin hexamerus (meaning sixth).

References

Moths described in 2012
Eudonia